Hooman (هومن) is a Persian male name which means 'benevolent and good natured'.

Hooman is synonymous to Vahooman (وهومن) and Bahman (بهمن). It is featured on the Faravahar of the Zoroastrian faith. The three "Hu's" are represented by the three sections of the wings of the Faravahar. It consists of the word "Hu" which is a combination of Humata, modern-day Pendar-e or Andeesh-e Nik (Good Thoughts); Hukhta, modern-day Goftār-e Nik (Good Words), and Huvarshta, modern-day Kerdār-e Nik (Good Deeds), and the Persian word "Man", which means 'Me' or 'I' in Persian. The name literally translates to "I have good thoughts, good deeds, and good words". Non-Persian languages do not have their own version of the name such as "men" in Mazandarani or "Mu/Mi" in Eastern Gilaki, but the pronunciation may differ slightly during speech such as "men" in Mazandarani or "mən" in Gilaki instead of the Persian pronunciation "mæn". It is the antonym of "Doshman" (دشمن), which means 'malevolent, enemy, or fetes'.

Hooman is not to be confused with the name Houmān (هومان), as in Ferdowsi's story of Rostam and Sohrab in the Shahnameh.

Notable people with the name include:

Given name 
 Hooman Barghnavard, Iranian actor
 Hooman Darabi, Iranian-American electrical engineer
 Hooman Khalatbari, Iranian-Austrian pianist and conductor
 Hooman Majd, Iranian-American journalist and commentator
 Hooman Radfar, British-born American investor and entrepreneur
 Hooman Tavakolian, Iranian-American wrestler and coach

Surname 
 Charles Hooman (1887–1969), English amateur sportsman
 Harry Hooman (born 1991), English footballer
 Julie Hoomans (born 1997), Dutch fashion model
 Thomas Hooman (1850–1938), English association football player